Samuel Dunlop, CMG served in several capacities as a member of the Straits Settlements civil service but is perhaps best known as the Inspector-General of Police, in Singapore.

Pangkor Treaty 1874

The Pangkor meeting took place in the middle of January 1874 on board the H. M. S. Pluto moored off the picturesque Island of Pangkor, off Perak state – the oldest Sultanate of the three Western states.

The three parties involved in the fateful engagement were the British, the Malay rulers, and the Chinese. 

British Officials Present were:
 Major-General Sir Andrew Clarke, the Governor, Commander-in-Chief, and Vice-Admiral of the Straits Settlements
 Mr. Bradell, the Attorney-General
 Major J.F.A. McNair, the Colonial Engineer
 Colonel Samuel Dunlop, the Inspector-General of Police
 Mr. A.M. Skinner of the Secretariat
 William A. Pickering, officer in charge of Chinese affairs
 Frank A. Swettenham, interpreter of Malay from the Land Revenue Office

The Malay rulers present were 
 Raja Abdullah
 Raja Idris
 Raja Bendahara
 the Mantri Ngah Ibrahim
 the Temenggong
 the Shahbandar 
 the Raja Mahkota 
 the Laxamana 
 the Dato Sagor

Twenty six Chinese were present, led by their respective headmen, Chin Ah Yam of the Ghee Hins and Chung Keng Quee of the Hai Sans as well as Chinese interpreter, (Marcus Chong  or Wong Ah Chong).

Pacification Commission

In 1875, he was appointed to the Commission for the Pacification of Larut serving alongside fellow commissioners McNair, Swettenham, Pickering and Capitans China Chung Keng Quee and Chin Seng Yam.

Inspector-General of Police

Captain, Major, and then Colonel, Samuel Dunlop served in Singapore as the Inspector-General of Police of the Straits Settlements in 1875 succeeding Thomas Dunman and held that position till 1890, handing over the reins to RW Maxwell (1891-1895).

Singapore Municipality

Samuel Dunlop was President of the Singapore Municipal Commission in 1887.

Trustee Presbyterian Church, Singapore

In 1899 together with Robert Little, John Hutchinson Robertson, John Anderson, Robert Jamie, Alexander Maughan Martin, Thomas Cuthbertson, William McKerrow and William Alexander Pickering, Samuel Dunlop became a trustee of the Presbyterial Church in Singapore.

Freemason District Grandmaster, Singapore

On 28 December 1885, Colonel Samuel Dunlop was installed as District Grand Master of the Freemasons in Singapore (1885-91) by W Bro Cargill. The Straits Times Overland Journal of 17 December 1878 reported a meeting of 20 Brethren at the Exchange Rooms. It was resolved that a new Masonic Hall should be erected. To cover the cost, promises were made that 240 shares of $25 each should be subscribed for, "owing, in great measure, to the energy of Major Dunlop". He was Worshipful Master of The Lodge of St George in 1879-80 and District Grand Master from 1885-1891, succeeding R.W. Bro. W. H. M. Read.

Dunlop Street

Dunlop Street in Singapore's Little India area (originally known as Rangasamy Road), is believed to have been named after Samuel Dunlop.

See also
Corresp: Actions of Perak Expeditionary Force post-murder of Birch
Governor of Penang
Commissioner of Police (Singapore)

References 

British colonial police officers
Singaporean police officers
History of Penang
Governors of Penang
Year of birth missing
Year of death missing